Chariots of War is an isometric 2D computer wargame, developed by Slitherine Software and Paradox Interactive, and published by Strategy First. It is set in the ancient Near East.

Gameplay

The strategic layer of Chariots of War is turn-based, though unlike Civilization, the focus is almost entirely on real-time tactical combat. The game is similar to Slitherine's earlier wargame Legion, and uses the same graphics engine.

There are 58 different civilizations to play, all divided into the following ethnic groups:

 Assyrian
 Bedouin
 Egyptian
 Hittites
 Mitanni
 Nubian
 Skythian (Scythian)
 Summerian (Sumerian)
 Syrian
 Tribal

There are nine different resources to collect (food, building materials, copper, tin, wood, gold, gems, incense, and horses), which are used to construct buildings and units. While trade and diplomacy do feature in the game, they are of lesser importance, as conquest is the only way to attain victory.

The battles themselves take place on a separate deployment screen. The player's forces are positioned across one third of the battlefield, and the player alters their formations and gives certain orders. As in Legion, the actual fighting is automated, so the initial orders are the only input in the battle until it is over.

The game features both campaign and non-campaign modes of play.

Reception

The game received "mixed" reviews according to the review aggregation website Metacritic.

References

External links

2003 video games
Video games with isometric graphics
Paradox Interactive games
Turn-based strategy video games
Windows games
Windows-only games
Video games developed in the United Kingdom
Video games set in antiquity
Video games set in the Middle East
Computer wargames
Strategy First games
Slitherine Software games
Single-player video games